Joseph Carrara (born 9 March 1938) is a French racing cyclist. He won stage 5 of the 1962 Giro d'Italia.

References

External links
 

1938 births
Living people
French male cyclists
French Giro d'Italia stage winners
Place of birth missing (living people)